Jonatan Sersam (born 2 June 1986) is a Swedish composer and pianist. His music has been performed by Malmö Symfoniorkester, Helsingborgs Symfoniorkester, ensemble ICTUS , Schallfeld Ensemble, Ensemble Zeitfluss, Ensemble FontanaMix, Norrköpings Symfoniorkester, Swedish Wind Ensemble, Marco Fusi, Ruído Vermelho, Musica Vitae and the Kreutzer Quartet among others.

Biography 
Jonatan Sersam was born 1986 in Lövestad, Skåne län. Jonatan Sersam studied composition with Luca Francesconi at the Malmö Academy of Music.

Works 
 Beyond Lust, for string trio, narrator, electronics and video, 2022. Video by Anna-Karin Rasmusson
 Presencia de Sombra, for bass viol, cello and soprano, 2022
 Tinget, chamber opera, 2021. Libretto by Niklas Hansson
 Platform Findings, for saxophone and percussion, 2021
 Beredskapsarbetaren, chamber opera, 2020. Libretto by Niklas Hansson
 Aria, for bassoon, 2020
 Debajo, for double bass, 2020
 Charcoal Oblique, for symphony orchestra, 2019/20
 A questa voce, for bass flute, bass clarinet, cello, violin, guitar and piano, 2020
 Min Egen Lilla Liten, chamber opera, 2019. Libretto by the composer after Ulf Stark.
 passing lodestones, for accordion and clarinet, 2019
 Tabula Scalata, for orchestra, 2018
 Pareidolia, for viola d'amore, 2018
 Gnistor, for symphony orchestra, 2018
 Som en hemlighet, for symphony orchestra, 2017
 SCENEN.HANDLINGEN, for two amplified sopranos & chamber ensemble, 2017. Lyrics by Inger Christensen
 Sånger 2, for cello and piano, 2017
 Phono Junction, for 15 musicians, 2016
 Vindöga, for five bassoons, piano, marimba and double bass, 2016
 Sånger, for bass flute and viola, 2016
 En gång, dansa med mig, for soprano and piano, 2016. Lyrics by Karin Lundin
 Fluttuante, for flute and piano, 2015
 Frön, for flute, clarinet, cello, violin and piano, 2015
 Atavisms, for clarinet, saxophone, piano, percussion and double bass, 2015
 Aporia, for string quartet, 2014
 Gigue, for large orchestra, 2014
 Natura, for orchestra and choir, 2014
 Grosso, for sinfonietta with piano, 2014
 Favola, for wind quintet, 2014
 Circum, audiodrama with processed voices and electronic music, 2013–14
 Antimi, for mixed ensemble, 2013
 Murex, for orchestra, 2013
 The Hoodoo Machine, for cello, percussion and electronics, 2013
 Musica Di Strada, for piano, 2013
 La Clessidra, for sinfonietta, 2013
 Movements 1-7 for accordion, double bass and saxophone, 2013
 Bakom Jorden, for Ocarina quartet, 2012
 Portali , for brass quintet, 2012
 Reminiscenser, for string orchestra, 2012
 Ich fuhle..., for flute, 2 clarinets, trumpet, piano, celesta, male singer and strings, 2012
 Friktion , for piano, clarinet, flute and cello, 2011
 Destinations I, II & III, for string quartet, 2011
 Haust for choir & piano, 2011
 Chamber Symphony, for orchestra, 2010
 Etude for solo violin, 2010
 Infusione, for chamber orchestra, 2010
 Bland Näckrosor, for soprano and piano, 2010. With lyrics by Gunnar Ekelöf
 Scener, for orchestra, 2010
 Draug, for wind orchestra, 2009

References

Citations

General references
 
 Helgeandkyrkans program 26/1 2013
 Swedish Musical Heritage Jonatan Sersam

External links 
 Jonatan Sersam member of fst
 Peter Shepperd
 Jonatan Sersam's premiere at Malmö Live opening

1986 births
Living people
Swedish classical composers
Swedish male classical composers